The Stanley River is a river of the Canterbury region of New Zealand's South Island. Lake Guyon drains to the Stanley River via a swampy tributary named Stanley Vale. In its lower reaches the river passes through a gorge known as Stanley Gate.
The Fowler Pass Track follows the river for much of its length.

References

Rivers of Canterbury, New Zealand
Rivers of New Zealand